Carlo Soldo (born 13 April 1942) is an Italian football defender and later manager.

Club career

Soldo was raised in Milan, where he played in the youth teams of Folgore before moving to Novara, where he played for the first time in Serie B in 1960-61. He then moved to Varese, contributing to their promotion in Serie A in 1963-64. With Varese he played another two seasons in Serie A.

In 1966 he moved to Inter, with which he played the 1966-67 European Cup scoring a goal in the second round against Vasas Budapest. Not being considered much by Inter's manager Helenio Herrera he was never used in the league, and on November 1967 he moved to Lazio in Serie B. There he contributed again to their promotion in 1968-69. An injury to his knee made his further career unnoticeable in minor series until 1974.
 
Soldo scored a total of 67 appearances and 2 goals in Serie A and 86 appearances and 2 goals in Serie B.

Manager career
He then moved to a manager career. Among his most notable appearances, he gained a promotion in Serie C1 in 1988-89 with Fidelis Andria.

References

1942 births
Living people
Italian footballers
Novara F.C. players
S.S.D. Varese Calcio players
Inter Milan players
S.S. Lazio players
A.C. Monza players
F.C. Pro Vercelli 1892 players
A.C.R. Messina players
U.S. Triestina Calcio 1918 players
Association football defenders
Italian football managers
F.C. Pro Vercelli 1892 managers
Treviso F.B.C. 1993 managers
Casale F.B.C. managers
A.S.D. HSL Derthona managers
Aurora Pro Patria 1919 managers
S.S.D. Varese Calcio managers
S.S. Fidelis Andria 1928 managers
S.S.D. Pro Sesto managers
F.C. Südtirol managers
U.S. Imperia 1923 managers
Calcio Lecco 1912 managers
Virtus Bergamo Alzano Seriate 1909 managers
U.S. Alessandria Calcio 1912 managers
Inter Milan non-playing staff